is a 1965 epic anti-war film directed by Frank Sinatra, with special effects by Eiji Tsuburaya. Produced by Tokyo Eiga, Toho, and Sinatra Enterprises, it was the first film to be internationally co-produced between Japan and the United States.

Plot
During an unspecified period of World War II, a platoon of 16 Japanese soldiers is stranded on an island in the Solomon Archipelago with no means of communicating with the outside world. Lieutenant Kuroki keeps his men firmly in hand and is supervising the building of a boat for their escape.

An American C-47/R4D transport plane is shot down by a Japanese Zero, crash landing on the same island. The Zero and an American F4U Corsair destroy each other, with no outside commands learning of the island. Marine Aircraft Wing Captain Dennis Bourke assumes command of the platoon of Marines he was transporting, over their buffoonish and incompetent 2nd Lieutenant Blair and Sergeant Bleeker. Confidante to Bourke is Navy chief pharmacist's mate Francis. As the 19 Americans learn of the Japanese platoon's existence on the island, tension mounts resulting in a battle for the Japanese boat. The vessel is destroyed and a Japanese soldier is seriously injured. Calling a truce, Koruki trades the Americans access to water in exchange for a visit from their doctor to treat the wounded soldier, whose leg has to be amputated.

The truce results in both platoons, reduced in numbers through their earlier conflicts and later natural disasters, choosing to live side by side – although a line is drawn forbidding one from encroaching on the other's side of the island. There is some clandestine cooperation and trading and earnest respect and friendship.

When the Americans establish radio contact and their pickup by a US naval vessel is arranged, they demand that the Japanese surrender, but Kuroki reestablishes that they are at war. As the Americans proceed to the beach, Bourke orders his men to be ready to shoot to kill. When they are ambushed by the remaining 8 men of the Japanese platoon, the remaining 11 Americans are given no option but to retaliate, resulting in a bloody and pointless firefight during which all the Japanese and most of the Americans are shot dead. Only Francis, Bourke, Bleeker, Blair, and Corporal Ruffino survive the skirmish. Bourke orders Francis to examine the mortally wounded Kuroki to see if he can be saved. They move onto the beach and wait to be rescued by the American naval vessel, stationed just offshore. Francis reports Kuroki's death and hands Bourke the Japanese officer's journal, written in Japanese with what appears to be an address. Bourke speculates that one day he will be able to deliver it to Kuroki's widow. Kuroki's final narration calls what he is to do "just another day."

Cast

American platoon

Japanese platoon

Other 

 Nami Tamura as Keiko, Kuroki's wife
 Laraine Stephens as Lorie, Dennis's fiancée (uncredited)

Production

Filming

Rip tide incident

During filming, on May 10, 1964, in Hawaii, Sinatra was caught in a rip tide along with Ruth Koch, wife of Howard Koch. Actor Brad Dexter (Sgt. Bleeker) and two surfers were able to rescue Sinatra and Koch, saving their lives.

Special effects
Special effects for the film were handled by Toho’s special effects crew. Eiji Tsuburaya was the special effects director.

Release
None but the Brave was released in Japan on 15 January 1965 where it was distributed by Toho. It premiered in the United Sates on February 11, 1965 at the Oriental Theatre in Chicago, Illinois and was released throughout the U.S. in the same month.

Critical response 
Upon release, The New York Times’ Bosley Crowther  gave the production a largely negative review, writing, "A minimum show of creative invention and a maximum use of cinema clichés are evident in the staging of this war film," and "Mr. Sinatra, as producer and director, as well as actor of the secondary role of the booze-guzzling medical corpsman, displays distinction only in the latter job. Being his own director, he has no trouble stealing scenes, especially the one in which he burbles boozy wisecracks while preparing to saw off the shivering Japanese's leg. Mr. Sinatra is crashingly casual when it comes to keeping the Japanese in their place." Crowther also noted "Clint Walker … Tommy Sands … Brad Dexter … and Tony Bill … make over-acting—phony acting—the trademark of the film. What with incredible color and the incredible screenplay of Katsuya Susaki and John Twist, this adds up to quite a fake concoction."

Current critic Robert Horton (of Washington's The Herald) calls None but the Brave "a 1965 anti-war picture that turns out to be much more interesting and compelling than its reputation would suggest," that "predates the rash of anti-war counterculture movies by a few years," also noting that it "bears the influence of Bridge on the River Kwai with a little Mister Roberts thrown in, but it has a bitterness about war that goes all the way through to the forceful final title, a reflection of Sinatra's liberal views at the time.” Horton points out that Clint Eastwood received a lot of credit for making two films that showed World War II from the American and the Japanese sides (Flags of Our Fathers and Letters from Iwo Jima), but that "in a way, Sinatra had already done it, and in one movie."

Comic book adaptation
 Dell Movie Classic: None but the Brave (April–June 1965)

References

Footnotes

Sources

External links 
 
 
 
 

1965 films
1965 war films
American war films
Anti-war films about World War II
Films scored by John Williams
Films adapted into comics
Films directed by Frank Sinatra
Films set in Oceania
Films set on islands
Films shot in Hawaii
1960s Japanese-language films
Japanese war films
Pacific War films
Films about the United States Marine Corps
War adventure films
Warner Bros. films
Films produced by Frank Sinatra
1965 directorial debut films
American World War II films
Japanese World War II films
1960s English-language films
1960s American films
1960s Japanese films